Squint Entertainment was a record label owned by Word Entertainment, started and run by musician and songwriter Steve Taylor in 1997. Squint pushed Sixpence None the Richer to mainstream success with their single "Kiss Me". The band had been in the CCM genre for several years before that. Other successful bands, such as Chevelle, emerged from Squint's brief creative life.

History 
It first appeared in the United States in 1997. In an attempt to bring meaningful Christian content to other media, the company started a major film project called St. Gimp. The project was abandoned when Taylor was forced out of the company leadership.

The label name was resurrected by Word Entertainment after Taylor's departure, to create a new, unrelated label as an avenue for potential crossover acts under their newfound partnership with AOL Time Warner. The only common element was the existence of Sixpence None the Richer on the label's roster, due to their existing contract.

Artists 

 Burlap to Cashmere
 Chevelle
 The Insyderz
 LA Symphony
 PFR
 Radial Angel
 Sixpence None the Richer
 Strange Celebrity
 38th Parallel
 Waterdeep

See also 
 List of record labels

References

External links 
 The Phantom Tollbooth - Steve Taylor discussing the end of Squint

Record labels established in 1997
Defunct record labels of the United States
Christian rock
Christian record labels
Companies established in 1997
Companies based in San Francisco